Ben Oakley may refer to:

Ben Oakley (canoeist), British canoeist who won a bronze medal at the Wildwater Canoeing World Championships
Ben Oakley (cricketer), Australian cricketer who played Big Bash League for the Adelaide Strikers